Ozarba nyanza is a moth of the family Noctuidae first described by Rudolf Felder and Alois Friedrich Rogenhofer in 1874. It is found Yemen, Saudi Arabia, Oman, Kenya, Madagascar and South Africa.

References
Felder, C.; Felder, R. & Rogenhofer, A. F. (1864–1875). Reise der österreichischen Fregatte Novara um die Erde in den Jahren 1857, 1858, 1859 unter den Befehlen des Commodore B. von Wüllerstorf-Urbair. Zoologischer Theil. Zweiter Band. Abtheilung 2, Heft 4, Lepidoptera. Atlas der Heterocera. 2:1–20, pls. 1–140.

Acontiinae
Moths of Africa
Moths of Madagascar
Moths of the Middle East
Moths described in 1874